Steve Thomas Steinbeiss (born May 5, 1981) is an American mixed martial artist who recently fought in the middleweight division of the Ultimate Fighting Championship.

Mixed martial arts career

Ultimate Fighting Championship

Steinbeiss was part of the transfer of light heavyweight and middleweight fighters in the WEC to the UFC.

He was supposed to make his debut at UFC Fight Night 18 against Ryan Jensen, but the fight was pulled from the card. It was then rescheduled for UFC Fight Night: Diaz vs. Guillard. Steinbeiss lost the fight after Jensen applied a guillotine choke and the referee prematurely stopped the fight thinking Steve was out. Steinbeiss was instead giving the ref the thumbs up, the referee proclaimed that he thought Steinbeiss went limp.

Steinbeiss was expected to face Nick Catone on January 11, 2010 at UFC Fight Night 20, but was pulled from the card before the event due to injury.

Steinbeiss then faced Rob Kimmons on August 1, 2010 at UFC on Versus 2. Steinbeiss lost by unanimous decision to Kimmons and was released from the UFC.

Kickboxing record 

|-
|-  bgcolor="#CCFFCC"
| 2006-08-12 || Win ||align=left| Dustin Hanning || K-1 World Grand Prix 2006 in Las Vegas II, Reserve Match || Las Vegas, Nevada, USA || Decision (unanimous) || 3 || 3:00 
|-
|-  bgcolor="#CCFFCC"
| 2006-03-03 || Win ||align=left| John James || World Combat League || Las Vegas, Nevada, USA || Decision (58.5-56.5) || 2 || 3:00 
|-
|-  bgcolor="#CCFFCC"
| 2005-04-30 || Win ||align=left| Dan Evensen || K-1 World Grand Prix 2005 in Las Vegas || Las Vegas, Nevada, USA || Decision (unanimous) || 3 || 3:00 
|-
|-
| colspan=9 | Legend:

Mixed martial arts record

|-
| Win
| align=center| 9–4
| Dano Moore
| Submission (rear-naked choke) 
| Bellator 55
| 
| align=center| 1
| align=center| 4:52
| Yuma, Arizona, United States
| 
|-
| Win
| align=center| 8–4
| Rudy Aguilar
| Submission (rear-naked choke)
| Rage in the Cage 154
| 
| align=center| 1
| align=center| 1:23
| Chandler, Arizona, United States
| 
|-
| Win
| align=center| 7–4
| Travis McCullough
| Submission (punches)
| Griggs Entertainment: Roberts vs. Steinbeiss
| 
| align=center| 1
| align=center| 3:20
| Sullivan, Indiana, United States
| 
|-
| Win
| align=center| 6–4
| Terence Joseph Medrud
| Submission (kick to the body)
| Crowbar MMA: Spring Brawl 2
| 
| align=center| 2
| align=center| 2:57
| Fargo, North Dakota, United States
| 
|-
| Win
| align=center| 5–4
| Issac Appel
| Submission (inverted neck crank)  	
| Crowbar MMA: Winter Brawl
| 
| align=center| 1
| align=center| 4:39
| Grand Forks, North Dakota, United States
| 
|-
| Loss
| align=center| 4–4
| Rob Kimmons
| Decision (unanimous)
| UFC Live: Jones vs. Matyushenko
| 
| align=center| 3
| align=center| 5:00
| San Diego, California, United States 
| 
|-
| Loss
| align=center| 4–3
| Ryan Jensen
| Technical Submission (guillotine choke)
| UFC Fight Night: Diaz vs. Guillard
| 
| align=center| 1
| align=center| 3:56
| Oklahoma City, Oklahoma, United States
| Middleweight debut
|-
| Loss
| align=center| 4–2
| Carmelo Marrero
| Decision (split)
| WEC 36: Faber vs. Brown
| 
| align=center| 3
| align=center| 5:00
| Hollywood, Florida, United States
| 
|-
| Win
| align=center| 4–1
| Francisco Alcantara
| TKO (punches)
| Rock & Sock Promotions
| 
| align=center| 1
| align=center| 2:33
| Laughlin, Nevada, United States
| 
|-
| Win
| align=center| 3–1
| Wayne Andrews
| Submission (arm-triangle choke)
| MTXAFN 1: Let's Get it On
| 
| align=center| 1
| align=center| 2:11
| Las Vegas, Nevada, United States
| 
|-
| Win
| align=center| 2–1
| Antony Rea
| KO (punch)
| Bodog Fight: Vancouver
| 
| align=center| 2
| align=center| 3:18
| Vancouver, British Columbia, Canada
| 
|-
| Loss
| align=center| 1–1
| Bill Mahood
| Decision (unanimous)
| Bodog Fight: Clash of the Nations
| 
| align=center| 3
| align=center| 5:00
| St. Petersburg, Russia
| 
|-
| Win
| align=center| 1–0
| Jeff Ford
| TKO (punches)
| Bodog Fight: Clash of the Nations
| 
| align=center| 1
| align=center| 3:29
| St. Petersburg, Russia
|

References

External links

1981 births
Living people
American male mixed martial artists
American male kickboxers
Ultimate Fighting Championship male fighters